Simaethistis is a genus of moths in the superfamily Simaethistoidea. It was described by George Hampson in 1896.

Species
 Simaethistis leechi South, 1901 (China)
 Simaethistis tricolor Butler, 1889 (India)

References

Ditrysia